Alfred Tirrell (7 February 1894 – 1944) was an English footballer who played in the Football League for Luton Town and West Ham United.

References

1894 births
1944 deaths
English footballers
West Ham United F.C. players
Luton Town F.C. players
English Football League players
Peterborough & Fletton United F.C. players
Association football fullbacks